Theera Wongsamut (born 15 December 1948) is former minister of Agriculture and Cooperatives of Thailand. He is also leader of the Chartthaipattana Party until 2018.

Early life and education
Theera graduated high school from Pak Phanang School in Nakhon Si Thammarat and Triam Udom Suksa School in Bangkok. After finishing high school he Studied a bachelor's degree in the engineering irrigation field from Kasetsart University in 1970 and a master's degree in business administration from Kasetsart University.

Party activity
He was elected leader of the Chartthaipattana Party on 19 March 2013.

He replaced Chumpol Silpa-archa, who died on 21 January 2013.

Experiences
Theera Wongsamut had much experience before becoming Minister of Agriculture and Cooperatives. He starts his career as Engineer in Construction Division, Royal Irrigation Department in 1971. Then he was appointed as Deputy Director-General of Irrigation Department, Ministry of Agriculture and Cooperatives in 1998. Until 2006 he was appointed as Deputy Permanent Secretary of Ministry of Agriculture and Cooperatives. Finally, he was Director-General of Royal Irrigation Department, Ministry of Agriculture and Cooperatives. In the 2008 Abhisit Vejjajiva and Yingluck Shinawatra government, he was appointed as Minister of the Ministry of Agriculture and Cooperatives.

References

External links

Theera Wongsamut
Living people
1948 births
Theera Wongsamut
Theera Wongsamut
Theera Wongsamut

th:วงศ์สมุทรธีระ